Events in the year 1907 in Portugal.

Incumbents
Monarch: Emmanuel II
Prime Minister: João Franco

Events

Arts and entertainment

Sports
Leixões Sport Club founded

Births

28 March – Lúcia dos Santos, nun (died 2005).
11 August – José Delfim, Portuguese footballer (d. unknown).
8 September – Casimiro de Oliveira, racing driver (died 1970)
6 November – Delfim Santos, academic, philosopher, educationist, essayist and book and movie reviewer (died 1966).

Deaths
1 August – Ernesto Hintze Ribeiro, politician (born 1849)

References

 
1900s in Portugal
Portugal
Years of the 20th century in Portugal
Portugal